This page provides the summaries of the matches of the qualifying rounds for the group stage of the 2012 African Women's Championship.

A total of 24 national teams entered qualification, which was held over two rounds. In the preliminary round, 20 nations were drawn in pairs. The ten winners joined the four semifinalists of the 2010 Women's African Football Championship in the first round, where the seven winners qualified for the finals.

Preliminary round
The preliminary round was held on 13–15 January 2012 (first leg) and 27–29 January 2012 (second leg).

Summary

|}

Notes
Note 1: Mozambique advanced to the first round after Kenya withdrew.
Note 2: Senegal advanced to the first round after Burundi withdrew.

Matches

 
Ethiopia advances to the first round.

 
Tanzania advances to the first round.

 
Côte d'Ivoire advances to the first round.

 
Mozambique advanced to the first round after Kenya withdrew. 

 
Zambia advances to the first round.

 
Morocco advances to the first round.

 
Senegal advanced to the first round after Burundi withdrew. 

 
Zimbabwe advances to the first round.

 
Congo DR advances to the first round.

 
Ghana advances to the first round.

First round
The first round was held on 25–27 May 2012 (first leg) and 15–17 June 2012 (second leg).

Summary

|}
Notes
Note 1: Match has been called off. DR Congo advanced to the final tournament, as Equatorial Guinea is qualified as hosts.

Matches

 
Ethiopia advances to the final tournament.

 
Côte d'Ivoire advances to the final tournament.

 
South Africa advances to the final tournament.

 
Senegal advances to the final tournament.

 
Nigeria advances to the final tournament.

 
Cameroon advances to the final tournament.

Matches cancelled; Equatorial Guinea qualify automatically as host of final tournament, and Congo DR qualify as walkover winners of this tie.

References

External links

Qual
2012 in women's association football
2012 in African football
2012